was a fudai feudal domain under the Tokugawa shogunate of Edo period Japan.  It was located in Echigo Province, in the Hokuriku region of  Honshū. The domain was centered at Shiiya Jin'ya, located on the coast of what is now part of the city of Kashiwazaki in Niigata Prefecture.

History
For his role in the Siege of Osaka, Hori Naoyuki, the 4th son of the famous general Hori Naomasa, was granted 5,500 koku holding in Echigo Province July 1616. He built a jin'ya in Shiiya to administer his new domain. Naoyuki's son Hori Naokage, served as Edo bugyō and Jisha-bugyō in the shogunal administration, and for which he was awarded additional holdings with a kokudaka of 9,500 koku, to which he added an additional 2,000 koku of newly developed rice lands. This enabled him to qualify for the status of daimyō. He established his seat in Kazusa Province at Kazusa-Kariya Domain (1642-1668) in what is now part of the city of Isumi, Chiba. His son, Hori Naoyoshi, moved to Kazusa-Hachiman Domain (1668-1698) in what is now part of Ichihara, Chiba. Tori Naoyoshi's son Hori Naosada then moved the clan's seat to the original jin'ya in Echigo Province in 1698, which marked the official start of Shiiya Domain. The clan headquarters remained at Shiiya until the Meiji restoration; however, the daimyō remained in permanent residence in Edo and managed the domain as absentee landlords. 

During the period of the 8th daimyō, Hori Akitomo, fiscal reforms were implemented; however, Akitomo was of weak constitution and was unable to see the reforms through. The domain was also hit hard by the Great Tenmei famine, which resulted in considerable peasant unrest. 

During the Boshin War, the domain was a battleground in Battle of Hokuetsu. In July 1871, with the abolition of the han system, Shiiya Domain briefly became Shiiya Prefecture, and was merged into the newly created Niigata Prefecture. Under the new Meiji government, Hori Yukiyoshi, the final daimyō of Shiiya Domain was given the kazoku peerage title of danshaku (baron).

Bakumatsu period holdings
As with most domains in the han system, Shiiya Domain consisted of several discontinuous territories calculated to provide the assigned kokudaka, based on periodic cadastral surveys and projected agricultural yields.

Echigo Province
21 villages in Kariwa District
Shinano Province
2 villages in Minochi District
7 villages in Takai District

List of daimyō

See also
List of Han

Notes

References
The content of this article was largely derived from that of the corresponding article on Japanese Wikipedia.

External links
 Shiiya Domain on "Edo 300 HTML"

Domains of Japan
History of Niigata Prefecture
Echigo Province
Hokuriku region
Hori clan
Kashiwazaki, Niigata